Kateřina Winterová (born 12 February 1976) is a Czech actress, permanent member of the National Theatre in Prague, and vocalist for the band The Ecstasy of Saint Theresa.

Life and career

Childhood, studies, and theatre

Winterová was born in Benešov and spent her childhood in Mělník. From 1990 to 1996, she attended the musical drama department at the Prague Conservatory. During her studies, she performed at the Divadlo pod Palmovkou theatre. From 1996 to 1998, she appeared as a guest at the Klicperovo divadlo theatre in Hradec Králové and at the National Theatre in Prague. Since 1998, she has been a permanent member there.

Music
In 1998, Winterová joined the alternative rock band The Ecstasy of Saint Theresa on vocals, which at the time consisted only of founding member Jan Muchow. She has since released four studio albums with the project.

In 2002, she won the Anděl Award for Singer of the Year.

In 2004, Winterová contributed vocals to "A Lovely Day Tomorrow", a single by British Sea Power, as well as its Czech-language version, "Zítra Bude Krásný Den".

Cooking
Between 2013 and 2017, together with actress Linda Rybová, Winterová hosted the television cooking show Vaříme podle herbáře. The two also wrote five cookbooks, based on the show. Winterová has gone on to write several more food-related books.

Awards and nominations
 Anděl Award – Singer of the Year (2002)
 Nominated for Thalia Award – A Doll's House (2011)
 Nominated for Alfred Radok Award – A Doll's House (2011)
 Nominated as Best Actress at the Czech Lion Awards – Toman (2018)

Discography
with The Ecstasy of Saint Theresa
 In Dust 3 (1999)
 Slowthinking (2002)
 Watching Black (2006)
 101010 (2011)

Selected filmography

References

External links
 
 Kateřina Winterová at the National Theatre website

1976 births
Living people
People from Benešov
21st-century Czech women singers
20th-century Czech women singers
Czech rock musicians
Prague Conservatory alumni
Czech film actresses
Czech television actresses
Czech stage actresses
20th-century Czech actresses
21st-century Czech actresses